Lugnet HS134 is a large ski jumping hill located in Falun, Sweden. It has a hill size of HS134, a construction point of K-120. The hill has artificial lighting and bleachers for 15,000 viewers. Hill size has been increased from K-115, HS124 to K-120, HS134. The hill was built specifically for the World Cup Ski Championships in 1974. Last modernization took place from August 2012 to end of 2013 because of the preparations for the 2015 FIS Nordic World Ski Championships.

Hill record

Before the recent modernization, the hill record belonged to Matti Hautamäki, who jumped 130.5 metres. On 26 February 2014, Severin Freund set the current hill record of 135 metres.

Sports venues completed in 1974
Ski jumping venues in Sweden
Tourist attractions in Dalarna County